Johan Brattberg (born 28 December 1996) is a Swedish footballer who plays for Utsikten on loan from BK Häcken.

Club career
On 10 January 2022, Brattberg was loaned to Utsikten in Superettan.

Honours 
BK Häcken

 Allsvenskan: 2022

References

1996 births
Living people
Swedish footballers
Association football goalkeepers
Falkenbergs FF players
BK Häcken players
Utsiktens BK players
Allsvenskan players
Superettan players